The British Academy Television Craft Award for Best Photography: Factual is one of the categories presented by the British Academy of Film and Television Arts (BAFTA) within the British Academy Television Craft Awards, the craft awards were established in 2000 with their own, separate ceremony as a way to spotlight technical achievements, without being overshadowed by the main production categories. According to the BAFTA website, for this category the "eligibility is limited to the director of photography."

Several categories were presented to recognize photography and lighting in television programming:
 From 1978 to 1991 Best Film Cameramen was presented. 
 From 1978 to 1982 Best Television Cameramen was presented. 
 In 1978 Best Special Lighting Effects was presented.
 From 1978 to 1980 Best Television Lighting was presented.
 From 1981 to 1994 Best Video Lighting was presented.

In 1992, those categories transformed in two, Best Film or Video Photography - Factual and Best Film or Video Photography - Fiction/Entertainment until 1994 when they would be renamed for the last time, resulting in Best Photography: Factual and Best Photography & Lighting: Fiction respectively.

Winners and nominees

1990s
Best Film or Video Photography - Factual

Best Photography: Factual

2000s

2010s

2020s

 Note: The series that don't have recipients on the tables had Camera Team credited as recipients for the award or nomination.

See also
 Primetime Emmy Award for Outstanding Cinematography for a Nonfiction Program

References

External links
 

Photography: Factual